Zofia Bielczyk (née Filip; born 22 September 1958 in Warsaw) is a retired Polish hurdler. She achieved her biggest successes indoors, winning three medals at the European Indoor Championships.

Her indoor personal bests of 6.74 seconds for the 50 metres hurdles and 7.77 seconds for the 60 metres hurdles are former World records and still standing Polish records. In addition, her outdoor personal best for the 100 metres hurdles is 12.63.

She is married to a former javelin thrower, Piotr Bielczyk.

Competition record

References

1958 births
Living people
Polish female hurdlers
Athletes from Warsaw
World record setters in athletics (track and field)
Athletes (track and field) at the 1980 Summer Olympics
Olympic athletes of Poland